The 1940 Troy State Red Wave football team represented Troy State Teachers College (now known as Troy University) as a member of the Alabama Intercollegiate Conference (AIC) and the Southern Intercollegiate Athletic Association (SIAA) during the 1940 college football season. Led by fourth-year head coach Albert Choate, the Red Wave compiled an overall record of 3–6, with a mark of 2–1 in AIC play. Troy State had a record of 1–3 against SIAA opponents, tying for 22nd place.

Schedule

References

Troy State
Troy State
Troy Trojans football seasons
Troy State Red Wave football